Mississippi's first art museum, the Lauren Rogers Museum of Art is located in Laurel, Mississippi, United States. It was founded in 1923 in memory of Lauren Eastman Rogers. The building's architect was Rathbone DeBuys of New Orleans, Louisiana.

The museum has an extensive collection of Native American baskets. It also has a selection of American art by Winslow Homer, Albert Bierstadt, and John Singer Sargent. It receives 32,000 visitors a year.

History
The Lauren Rogers Museum of Art was opened in 1923 as a memorial to Lauren Eastman Rogers, the only son and only grandson of two of the town's founding families. Lauren died at the age of 23 in 1921 from complications of appendicitis, just months after marrying Lelia Hodson Rogers. After his death, Lauren's father, Wallace Brown Rogers, and his maternal grandfather, Lauren Chase Eastman, created the Eastman Memorial Foundation "to promote the public welfare by founding, endowing and having maintained a public library, museum, art gallery and educational institution, within the state of Mississippi." The museum opened its doors on May 1, 1923, in a building that was originally being constructed to be Lauren and Lelia's private residence.

The Eastman, Gardiner and Rogers families had migrated to Laurel, Mississippi, from Clinton, Iowa, in the 1890s for timber resources. Their influence was fundamental in the formation of the city of Laurel. The Rogers family built large residences on broad avenues in Laurel, and the family helped lay the foundation for public parks and schools that served the city for many generations. Lauren Rogers was being groomed by his parents and grandparents to take over the family lumber business and continue the families philanthropic legacy in Laurel. The Rogers and Eastman families did not let Lauren's legacy die with him. Instead, they created Lauren's legacy for him through the establishing of this museum in his honor.

Throughout the years the museum has served various purposes. The original building not only served as an art gallery, but it also housed the town library. The first collection featured in the museum gallery was a large basket collection that was donated in 1923 by Lauren Rogers' great-aunt, Catherine Marshall Gardiner. A new wing was completed in 1925 giving the museum five art galleries on the first floor and space for the Laurel Library Association on the lower level, where they stayed until 1979. These new galleries were eventually filled with nineteenth- and twentieth-century paintings that were donated by the Rogers and Eastman families. This collection which includes works by famous artists such as Winslow Homer, Albert Bierstadt, Jean-Baptiste-Camille Corot, and Jean-François Millet became a part of the museum's permanent collection and can still be seen today. In 1953 Lelia Rogers added a Reading Room and filled it with furniture from her in-laws home and a portrait of her deceased husband, Lauren.

The building itself is a piece of art that has stood the test of time. The building's architect was Rathbone DeBuys of New Orleans, Louisiana. The interior was designed by the Chicago firm of Watson and Walton. The walls are paneled in quarter-sawn golden oak, accented by hand-wrought ironwork by Samuel Yellin, and a ceiling of hand-molded plaster done by master craftsman Leon Hermant. The original museum floors were cork and has been continued throughout the various additions.

Collections
The collection of the Lauren Rogers Museum of Art consists of five specialized collections: American art, European paintings, Native American baskets, Japanese Ukiyo-e prints, and British Georgian silver.
 
American Art 
One of the largest of these is our collection of American paintings, sculptures, and works on paper. The core of the collection is a group of 19th and 20th-century paintings donated by Lauren Chase Eastman, the grandfather of Lauren Rogers, in the 1920s and 1930s. Some of our most important works came from this astute collector, and many other important works were donated by Lauren Rogers’ parents, Nina and Wallace B. Rogers. These collectors focused on the landscape and portraiture traditions which have been such an important part of the history of American art. Most of the works are intimate in size, reflecting their origins in private collections, which were on display in private homes.
 
Landscape paintings in the museum collection date primarily from the late 19th century onward. The museum owns late examples of Hudson River School painting, the first group of painters to exclusively focus on and celebrate the American landscape. Artists such as John Frederick Kensett and Albert Bierstadt, whose works are on display in the American gallery, are typical of this movement. These artists were inspired by the Romantic movement in art and literature and strove to glorify the wonders of nature through their art. The American Impressionists of the early 20th century used the image of the landscape as a means of personal expression as well as a vehicle for exploring the medium of painting itself. Artists like John Henry Twachtman chose to portray intimate settings and quiet places in his pictures, some of which border on the abstract in their painterly quality and emphasis on color and light over form and drawing. Since the 1930s, the museum has added more modern landscape paintings, particularly by Mississippi artists like Marie Hull and William Dunlap. We continue to build on this fine collection of American landscapes.
 
British Georgian Silver 
Most of the works in the British Georgian Silver Collection were donated to the museum by the late Harriet and Thomas Gibbons. From the mid-1920s until 1959, Mr. Gibbons was the publisher of the Laurel Leader-Call, and Mrs. Gibbons was the editor. Both had a passion for silver which resulted in a magnificent and well-focused collection of silver luxury goods, most used in relation to English “high tea.”
 
The term “Georgian” refers to the period between 1714 and 1830 when four King Georges in a row ruled England. This time span saw a change in style; during the early 18th-century, English silver featured the abundant ornamentation of the Baroque and Rococo periods. By the end of the Georgian period, a restrained Neo-Classical style held sway, inspired by Classical forms and designs from ancient Greece and Rome.

European Art 
The museum owns approximately 65 European works of art, dating from the 17th to the 20th centuries. The core of the collection are 24 works donated by the Eastman and Rogers families during the early years of the museum's existence. These include important, internationally known works like Jean-François Millet's First Steps, an 1856 pastel which later inspired Vincent van Gogh; Landscape Near Paris (c.1885) by Jean-Baptiste-Camille Corot, considered one of the first modernist painters; and other influential early 19th-century painters.
 
The earliest work in the collection is an etching by Rembrandt van Rijn entitled Virgin and Child with Cat (1654), which depicts Mary and the infant Jesus in domestic interior. According to legend, the cat of the Madonna produced a litter of kittens in the stable where Christ was born; the cat of legend crouches next to the Madonna, as Joseph looks in through a window. This tiny etching is one of many Biblical illustrations produced by Rembrandt.

Japanese Woodblock Prints
The Japanese Gallery contains examples of ukiyo-e woodblock prints from the Edo Period (1600-1868). The term ukiyo-e means “images of the floating world.” This is a reference to the theater and entertainment districts of urban Japan, especially those in Kyoto and Tokyo (then known as Edo). The most popular subjects were those of leisure and pleasure: images of courtesans and actors, of erotica and of the Kabuki theater. Later, artists would adapt the ukiyo-e style that had been honed on these subjects to the depiction of landscapes, as in Hiroshige's album of prints, Thirty-Six Views of Fuji (c.1828-33).

Native American Art 
Around 1900, Catherine Marshall Gardiner of Laurel, Mississippi, read an article about Native American baskets and found herself tempted by the possibility of collecting them. Her husband, George Schuyler Gardiner, encouraged her to “go as far as she liked.” The Gardiners, the great-aunt and great-uncle of Lauren Rogers, moved to Laurel in the 1890s to establish a lumber company after the lumber business in their home state of Iowa had begun to slow. At first she planned to collect only contemporary baskets, but, she said, “the lure of old and fine work specimens soon gained the ascendancy.” When she embarked on this project, she little realized she would become one of the premier collectors of the period, often called “the golden age of basket collecting.” Mrs. Gardiner's quest for fine specimens led her to contact and visit basket dealers, other collectors, officials and teachers on reservations, and weavers, eventually becoming part of a national network of other basket aficionados.
 
By 1923, when she donated her collection of almost 500 baskets to the Lauren Rogers Museum of Art, she had amassed one of the most representative collections of North American Native basketry in the Southeastern United States. Over ten years later, Mrs. Gardiner wrote, “It has been a work of great charm.” In the intervening decades, the Lauren Rogers Museum of Art has added to the collection, particularly with baskets from the Southeast, but Mrs. Gardiner ’s vision has remained the foundation of the collection.
 
Humans have been making baskets for thousands of years; it is a craft that is common to all cultures. Today's Native American basket makers work within a tradition that is centuries old. For example, there are Choctaw weavers in Mississippi who are fifth generation basket weavers, following a tradition passed down from mother to daughter over many decades.

The legacy continues 
As the city of Laurel has grown and changed so has the museum grown and changed over the years. In the last 35 years the museum has received a few updates in architecture, as well as, in artistic holdings. In 1983 the museum received an addition designed by Micheal Foil, that included a new gallery for visiting collections and beautiful grand staircase made from Tennessee black marble. In more recent years, a large Chihuly piece has been added above this staircase. Another addition was completed in 2013 adding the Sanderson Gallery.

The museum continues to serve the community through various events and ongoing educational programs. The museum has several events such as the annual Blues Bash and Museum Gala. During the summer months the museum holds art camps and free family art days. In addition to events on museum property, the museum also goes to various places in the community such as city centers and holds Artreach art camps.

In 2018, the Lauren Rogers Museum of Art celebrated its 95th year of operation. The museum strives daily to continue the legacy that the Rogers, Eastman, and Gardiner families began in 1923. This, however, would not be possible without the continued support of donors and patrons. Admission to the museum is free, but donations are encouraged. Please visit the museum website for details on current exhibitions and upcoming events.

References

External links
Lauren Rogers Museum of Art - official site

Art museums and galleries in Mississippi
Museums in Jones County, Mississippi
Native American museums in Mississippi
Art museums established in 1923
1923 establishments in Mississippi